Tsetserleg , also romanized as Cecerleg ("park" or "garden") is the capital of Arkhangai Aimag (province) in Mongolia. It has a population of 16,553 (2000 census, with Erdenebulgan sum rural territories population was 18,519), 16,618 (2003 est.), 16,300 (2006 est.).

Tsetserleg is geographically located in the Bulgan sum in the south of the aimag. It is not to be confused with Tsetserleg sum in the north.

History

Tsetserleg is an ancient cultural and commercial centre. It was once the seat of a monastery (Zayiin Gegeen Monastery), built by the First Khalkh Zaya Pandita, Luvsanperenlei (1642–1715) (who should not be confused with Zaya Pandita Namkhaijantsan (1599–1662)). It consisted of the main Guden Süm, the Right, or Summer Semchin Temple, and the Left, or Winter Semchin Temple, all built in the early 1680s. The sixth Zaya Pandita, Jambatseren, was killed by the Communists in 1932, and the main Guden temple was turned into a museum. There is a seventh Zaya Pandita, but he mostly lives in Ulan Bator and visits only occasionally.

Facilities
Tsetserleg has an airport, with regular connections from and to Ulan Bator, a theatre, hotel, hospital, and an agricultural college. The main industry is food processing.

Famous people
 Bat-Erdenyn Batbayar (Baabar), historian
 Radnaasümbereliin Gonchigdorj
 Gelegjamtsyn Ösökhbayar, wrestler
 Maidarjavyn Ganzorig, cosmonaut and scientist

Climate
Tsetserleg has a dry-winter subarctic climate (Dwc). It is part of a microclimate which experiences cooler summers and warmer winters than the rest of Mongolia. Wind speed is also relatively calm on average. In the coldest month of winter, January, it is often the warmest place in the country and temperatures rarely plummet below -30 °C, often hovering at around -15 °C to -25 °C during nighttime and 5 °C to -15 °C during daytime. In January 2014 and 2015 the coldest temperature was -26 °C (each during a short cold snap) while average minimum temperature was -16 °C which was 12 degrees warmer than the Ulaanbaatar average minimum of -28.5 °C (January 2014 and 2015) and identical to the Hohhot average minimum of -16 °C (January 2014 and 2015). The average maximum temperature in January 2015 was 0 °C or the same as Hohhot while overall average January temperature was -9 °C again the same as Hohhot. The warmest temperature of the 10 days above 0 °C in January 2015 was 7 °C which was warmer than Hohhot in which the warmest of the 8 days above 0 °C in January 2015 was 6 °C. Dalanzadgad and Arvaikheer, two other 'mild' cities of Mongolia, experienced identical temperatures although average minimum was marginally warmer at -15 °C each while Dalanzadgad's warmest January day was marginally warmer at 8 °C. Tsetserleg belongs to USDA Plant Hardiness Zone 5.

Sister cities

References

 Don Croner's World Wide Wanders:  Tsetserleg
 "Tsetserleg" Encyclopædia Britannica
 Mongolia City Development Strategies for Secondary Cities 

Aimag centers
Arkhangai Province